Arthit Boodjinda (born 7 August 1994), is a Thai professional footballer who plays as a forward for Thai League 1 club Police Tero.

External links
 
 

1994 births
Living people
Arthit Boodjinda
Arthit Boodjinda
Association football forwards
Arthit Boodjinda
Arthit Boodjinda
Arthit Boodjinda
Arthit Boodjinda
Arthit Boodjinda
Aspire Academy (Qatar) players
Arthit Boodjinda